Utricularia paulineae is an affixed aquatic carnivorous plant that belongs to the genus Utricularia (family Lentibulariaceae). It is endemic to the coastal regions of Western Australia.

See also 
 List of Utricularia species

References 

Carnivorous plants of Australia
Eudicots of Western Australia
paulineae
Lamiales of Australia